Radiation-induced lung injury (RILI) is a general term for damage to the lungs as a result of exposure to ionizing radiation. In general terms, such damage is divided into early inflammatory damage (radiation pneumonitis) and later complications of chronic scarring (radiation fibrosis). Pulmonary radiation injury most commonly occurs as a result of radiation therapy administered to treat cancer.

Symptoms and signs
The lungs are a radiosensitive organ, and radiation pneumonitis can occur leading to pulmonary insufficiency and death (100% after exposure to 50 gray of radiation), in a few months. Radiation pneumonitis is characterized by:
Loss of epithelial cells
Edema
Inflammation
Occlusions airways, air sacs and blood vessels
Fibrosis

Symptoms of radiation pneumonitis include: fever, cough, chest congestion, shortness of breath, chest pain

Diagnosis

High resolution CT thorax

Treatment

“The Canadian Cancer society mentions these things that help to manage radiation,

Your healthcare team may recommend medicines to treat radiation pneumonitis, such as:

decongestants
cough suppressants
bronchodilators
corticosteroids to reduce inflammation
oxygen therapy
You can also try the following to help manage symptoms:

Rest if you feel short of breath.
Drink more fluids and use a cool-air vaporizer or humidifier to keep the air moist.
Use an extra pillow to raise your head and upper body while resting or sleeping.
Avoid the outdoors on hot, humid days or very cold days (which can irritate the lungs).
Wear light, loose-fitting tops and avoid anything tight around the neck, such as ties or shirt collars.“

For more information go to their website, as they have accurate information.“More Info”

See also
Radiation poisoning

References

Further reading

External links 

PubMed

Radiation health effects
Radiation therapy
Lung diseases due to external agents